Sanggau Regency (Hakka: Sîang-ngau) is a regency in the north-central section of  West Kalimantan province of Indonesia. As of the 2020 census, Sanggau Regency had a population of 484,836; the official estimate as at mid 2021 was 488,527. Alongside Landak, Sekadau, and Sintang, it is one of four West Kalimantan regencies with a predominantly Catholic populations.

History

Etymology 
The origin of the name Sanggau is disputed. One theory is that the word came from the Sanggau clan of the Dayak people, from which a noble of the Sukadana Kingdom originated. Another local legend says the name came from that of a plant that grows around the Sekayan River, where the Sanggau Kingdom was founded in the 4th century.

Early history 

The Kingdom of Sanggau is thought to have been founded on 7 April 1310, which is now commemorated as the anniversary of the founding of Sanggau town, where the regency seat is located. The kingdom was led by the princess Dara Nante, who abdicated and gave the throne to her personal assistant Dakkudak. Dakkudak, who proved to be an incompetent ruler, was unable to lead the kingdom's administration. He fled the kingdom in secret, abandoning the throne and leaving the kingdom paralyzed.:171

After Dakkudak's flight, the state of the kingdom is unclear until 1485, when one of Dara Nante's relatives, a princess named Dayang Mas Ratna took the throne. She moved the kingdom's capital from Labai Lawai to Mengkiang, which is close to the Sekayam river. During this time, she married Nurul Kamal, a Muslim from the Banten Sultanate. It is unclear whether Sanggau has adopted Islam at this point.:172 Ratna's successor was a princess named Dayang Puasa, who was related to the royal family of the neighbouring Sintang Kingdom.:32 During Puasa's reign, Sanggau and Sintang maintained good relations, and she consolidated power within the realm.:32

Puasa's successor was a king named Abang Gani, the kingdom's first male ruler. During his reign, Sanggau was involved in a conflict with the Matan Kingdom, which was also known as the Tanjungpura Kingdom. The conflict started when Gani's daughter Dayang Seri Gemala married a noble from the Matan royal family. Gemala's husband was unfaithful to her and married again, insulting the Sanggau royal family. Gemala was brought back to Sanggau not long after.:172 Following Gani, every ruler of Sanggau was male.:97 Gani's reign ended in 1614 and in 1658, the new king Abang Bungsu publicly converted to Islam, officially making Sanggau a sultanate. Bungsu changed his name to Sultan Mohammad Jamaluddin Kusumanegara. During Jamaluddin's reign, Sanggau moved its capital to its current location, Sanggau town. During this time, Sanggau formed ties with the Cirebon Sultanate in Java.:173

19th century 
Mohammad Tahir II ruled Sanggau from 1860 to 1876. Tahir II made an agreement that settled the border between Sanggau and Brunei Sultanate, which later defined the modern Indonesia–Malaysia border.:175 During Tahir II's reign, Sanggau made its first contact with the Dutch Empire. Tahir II welcomed the Dutch in the kingdom's capital and allowed them to build an outpost in Sanggau.:175

Tahir II died in 1876 and was succeeded by Sultan Sulaiman Paku Negara. The era after Tahir II is defined by the start of Dutch control over the region. In 1877, the sultan of Sanggau and the governor-general of the Dutch East Indies, Johan Wilhelm van Lansberge, signed a treaty leasing land to the Dutch East Indies. in 1921, the Dutch forced Sultan Muhammaid Said Pakunegara to step down and he was replaced by Sultan Tahir III.

20th century 

In 1942, Japan occupied the Dutch East Indies. During that time, the reigning sultan of Sanggau was Sultan Muhammad Arif Pakunegara. His reign only lasted for a year; he was killed by Japanese forces and replaced by pro-Japanese Sultan Marhabah Saleh.:98 Marhabah Saleh was succeeded by Gusti Ali Akbar. The region also underwent conflict between natives and Japanese forces over forced labour, known as the Dayak Desa War. The town Meliau in Sanggau was captured briefly by Dayaks and revolting labourers but the Japanese recaptured it on 31 August 1945.

After the Japanese surrendered, the region was left in a power vacuum. Ali Akbar was supportive of the establishment of an Indonesian republic and the returning Dutch staged a coup against him using troops under the command of a Dutchman named Riekerk. Ali Akbar was replaced by Muhammad Taufik Surya Negara,:177 whose reign lasted until the abolishment of swapraja (autonomous royal regions) under the newly recognized Indonesian Republic on 2 May 1960, ending the existence of the sultanate.

Recent history 

After fall of Suharto and the rapid decentralization that followed, on 18 December 2003 Sanggau Regency was split to create a new Sekadau Regency, reducing its size. On 26 July 2006, Sanggau Sultanate was revived by cultural figures with the assistance of local government, nearly 49 years after its abolition. The sultanate was only intended for symbolic and cultural purposes, and no longer held political power. The revival ceremony was attended by several other Indonesian ceremonial monarchs such as sultan of Palembang, as well as local politicians.

Geography 
Sanggau Regency borders Sintang and Sekadau Regencies in the east, Malaysia in the north, Ketapang Regency in the south, and Landak Regency in the west. Sanggau Regency is located in the interior of Borneo, and is divided by the Kapuas River, which is one of the longest rivers in Indonesia. Its topography is dominated by wetlands and swamps, which are generally low-lying. The regency's soil formation is dominated by podzol, which covers around 44% of regency area. In Toba and Meliau Distirct, latosol soil can be found.

Climate 
Sanggau has a tropical rainforest climate with heavy to very heavy rainfall year-round. The wettest months generally are November and December with average rainfall on as many as 20 days while the driest is usually August with average of 5 days rainfall.

Governance

Administrative districts 
Sanggau Regency consists of fifteen districts (kecamatan). The areas and populations as of the 2010 and 2020 censuses<refBadan Pusat Statistik, Jakarta, 2021.</ref> are given below, together with the official estimates as at mid 2021.

Local government 
Sanggau is a second-level administrative division that is equivalent to a city. As a regency, it is headed by a democratically elected regent. Heads of districts are directly appointed by the regent with the recommendation of the regency secretary. Executive power lies with the regent and vice regent, and legislative function is exercised by the regency's parliament.

Politics 

On the provincial level, Sanggau Regency is part of 6th West Kalimantan electoral district with Sekadau Regency, which together send eight out of 65 representatives to the local parliament. The regency is divided into five electoral districts and has 40 representatives. The last election was in 2019 and the next one is due to be held in 2024.

Economy 
The biggest economic sectors in Sanggau are agriculture and manufacturing. Agriculture consist of 32.10% of regency's gross regional product (GRP) in 2020 while manufacture consist of 17.33%. Other significant sectors are retail and rade with 10.35% of regency's GRP, mining with 10.96%, and construction with 6.44%. The fastest growing sector was healthcare sector with an increase of 17.87% in 2020, followed by electricity and gas with an increase of 14.92%. The regency's workforce is dominated by agriculture, which employs more than 60% of the regency's working population. The regency main agricultural products are rubber, palm oil, and pepper. Other than that, the regency has a significant aquaculture sector, which produces 8,154 tons of freshwater fish in 2020. There are 75 active village cooperatives and 342 non-village cooperatives in Sanggau as of 2020.

Economic growth was 3.89% in 2019 but decreased to 0.70% in 2020 due to the COVID-19 pandemic and restrictions that were implemented. The unemployment rate was 3.52% and the poverty rate was 4.46%.

Demographics 
Sannggau had a population of 408,468 at the 2010 census, 444,095 at the 2015 census and 484,836 as of the 2020 census. The regency experienced a population growth of 1.67% in 2020. The most densely populated district was Parindu District with 66 people per square kilometre while the least densely populated was Toba District with 14 people per square kilometre. Kapuas district, where the town Sangga, the regency seat, is located, has a population of 88,308 people, making it the most populated district in the regency. The regency's sex ratio was 108, meaning there were 108 males for each 100 females. Toba District is also the fastest growing district with an annual population growth of 2.78% while the slowest growing district was Meliau.

As with most Indonesian regions, the population is relatively young and the workforce is dominated byu reproductive youths above 15 years old. In 2020, 241,987 of the regency's population are classified as part of the workforce. The 20-to-24 age group is the most populous age group in the regency in 2020. According to 2013 data, the literacy rate was 92.01%, which is lower than that of neighbouring regions.

The regency's population is predominantly Roman Catholic, consisting of 237,874 people in 2020. The second-largest religion is Islam with 164,885 people; this is followed by Protestantism with 82,384 people and Buddhism with 3,603 people.

Infrastructure

Education 
Sanggau Regency has 457 elementary schools, 122 junior higschools, 29 senior highschools, and 18 vocational highscools (SMK). There are 64 kindergartens in the regency.

There are several higher education institutions in Sanggau. Melawi Teaching and Education College has a campus branch located close to the Malaysian border in Entikong that offers a bachelor's degree in teaching-related majors such as mathematic education and elementary school teaching. Abditama Sanggau Agriculture and Plantation Academy is located close to Sanggau town. Other institutions include Sanggau Agrobusiness Management Academy, Belitang Polytech, and the state-owned Pontianak State Polytech also has campus in Sanggau. The regency government has expressed interest in establishing its own state-owned polytechnic.

The regency has one public library, which is managed by the regency government. In 2019, the old library building was demolished to make way for a new building. The new building was inaugurated in 2021.

Healthcare 

The regency has five hospitals including one maternity hospital, seven polyclinics, 89 puskesmas, 10 registered pharmacies, and over 640 healthcare centres. From 89 puskesmas, 18 are open 24 hours and accept inpatient care. The regency's main hospital is Mozes Thadeus Djaman Regional Hospital, which is located in  Sanggau town. It is a public hospital owned by the regency government. Indonesia's Ministry of Health classifies it  as a C-class hospital.

The regency's other major hospital is the D-class Sentra Medika General Hospital, which is  also located in Sanggau town. Other hospitals are located in Tayan Hulu and Sekayam Districts.

Owing to demand for PCR sample tests during the COVID-19 pandemic, which would previously need to be sent to Pontianak, the regency built a separate laboratory for PCR test in 2021.

Transport and communications

The regency has  of roads, of which  have not yet been paved. All roads in the regency are maintained by the regency government. The regency has 15 post offices, which are run by the state-owned Pos Indonesia. Being landlocked, the regency has no port; there is no public airport and travel is mostly by land. The closest airport is Tebelian Airport, which is located in Sintang Regency.

Perum DAMRI operates regular bus services between Pontianak and  Sanggau. Online ride-hailing services have also established presences in the regency, mostly in Sanggau town.

The regency has access to 4G internet services as well as fibre-optic service provided by Indihome under the state-owned telco Telkomsel. Sanggau town also has several Wi-Fi hotspots, which were initiated by local government.

Others 

In 2020, there are 337 mosques, 265 Protestant churches, 556 Catholic churches, two Hindu temples, and three Chinese Buddhist temples (Vihara) in the regency. There is an integrated border-crossing post in Entikong that has quarantine, clinic, and immigration facilities. It was renovated in 2016 and has since become a tourist attraction.

Sanggau town has several public parks such as Sanggau Permai Park, Kehati Green Park, and Sabang Merah Park. A stadium named Indoor Bujang Malaka Sport Complex is also located in Sanggau town. Convenience store chains such as Indomaret have established a presence in Sanggau town.

See also
 Roman Catholic Diocese of Sanggau

Footnotes

References

Regencies of West Kalimantan